The Pouter pigeons are domesticated varieties of the rock dove, Columba livia, characterized by a very large, inflatable crop.  They are kept as ornamental or fancy breeds, valued for their unusual appearance. There are many varieties of pouter with little in common except for the nature of the crop.  The origin of the breed group is unknown, but Pouters have been bred in Europe for at least 400 years.

Common varieties 
Brunner Pouter
Dutch Cropper
Elster Cropper
English Pouter
Gaditano Pouter
Ghent Cropper
Granadino Pouter
Holle Cropper
Horseman Thief Pouter
Marchenero Pouter
Norwich Cropper
Old German Cropper
Pigmy Pouter
Pomeranian Pouter
Reverse-wing Pouter
Voorburg Shield Cropper

See also
 List of pigeon breeds

References

External links 
 

Pigeon breeds
Domestic pigeons